The 2016 IPC Swimming European Championships was an international swimming competition. It was held in Funchal, Madeira running from 30 April to 7 May. Around 450 athletes from 50 different countries attended the competition. This was the last major swimming tournament for disabled athletes prior to the 2016 Summer Paralympics in Rio, and acted as a qualifying event for the Rio Games. To increase the possibility of qualification for top swimmers, the championships was made an Open tournament allowing competitors from countries outside Europe to compete.

Venue
The Championship was staged at the Complexo Olimpico de Piscinas da Penteada, which also held the 2005 Multi-nations Youth Meet and the 2015 Winter International Masters Open. The complex contains an Olympic sized swimming pool, a 25-metre pool, a diving pool and a training pool.

Events

Classification

Athletes are allocated a classification for each event based upon their disability to allow fairer competition between athletes of similar ability. The classifications for swimming are:
Visual impairment
S11-S13
Intellectual impairment
S14
Other disability
S1-S10 (Freestyle, backstroke and butterfly)
SB1-SB9 (breaststroke)
SM1-SM10 (individual medley)
Classifications run from S1 (severely disabled) to S10 (minimally disabled) for athletes with physical disabilities, and S11 (totally blind) to S13 (legally blind) for visually impaired athletes. Blind athletes must use blackened goggles.

Results

Men

Freestyle
 50m Freestyle

 100m Freestyle

 200m Freestyle

 400m Freestyle

Backstroke
 50m Backstroke

 100m Backstroke

Breaststroke
 50m Breaststroke

 100m Breaststroke

Butterfly
 50m Butterfly

 100m Butterfly

Individual medley
 150m Individual Medley

 200m Individual Medley

Relay
 4 × 100 m Freestyle Relay 

 4 × 100 m Medley Relay

Women

Freestyle
 50m Freestyle

 100m Freestyle

 200m Freestyle

400m Freestyle

Backstroke
 50m Backstroke

 100m Backstroke

Breaststroke
 50m Breaststroke

 100m Breaststroke

Butterfly
 50m Butterfly

 100m Butterfly

Individual medley
 150m Individual Medley

 200m Individual Medley

Relay
 4 × 100 m Freestyle Relay 

 4 × 100 m Medley Relay

Mixed

Relay
 4x50 m Freestyle Relay 

 4x50 m Medley Relay

Medal table

Multiple medallists
Many competitors won multiple medals at the 2016 Championships. The following athletes won five gold medals or more.

Participating nations
Below is the list of countries who participated in the Championships and the requested number of athlete places for each. As this was an Open Championship the countries are split between Europe and the Rest of the World.

Europe

  (3)
  (2)
  (6)
  (7)
  (6)
  (1)
 (12) 
  (6)
  (8)
  (4)
  (7)
  (1)
  (2)
 (20)
 (26)
 (13)
 (21)
  (4)
  (6)
  (9)
 (19)
  (1)
  (2)
  (1)
  (1)
  (4)
  (6)
 (17)
 (20)
  (4)
 (62)
  (1)
  (3)
 (36)
  (9)
  (3)
 (13)
 (47)

Rest of the World

 (11)
 (13)
  (1)
  (3)
  (5)
  (9)
  (2)
  (1)
  (1)
  (2)
  (2)
  (3)
  (5)

Footnotes
Notes

References

External links
 Official web-site

 
IPC Swimming European Championships
World Para Swimming European Championships
International aquatics competitions hosted by Portugal
Swimming competitions in Portugal
IPC Swimming World Championships
Sport in Madeira